Oroperipatus bluntschli is a species of velvet worm in the Peripatidae family. The original description of this species is based on a female specimen measuring 100 mm in length; its 40 pairs of legs are notable for approaching the maximum number (43) recorded in velvet worms. The type locality is in Peru.

References

Onychophorans of tropical America
Onychophoran species
Animals described in 1915